There are at least 38 named lakes and reservoirs in Faulkner County, Arkansas.

Lakes
 Boone Pond, el.  
 Grassy Lake, el.

Reservoirs

	Indian Head Lake, el.  
	Bailey Lake, el.  
	Beaver Fork Lake, el.  
	Bivans Lake, el.  
	Blacks Lake, el.  
	Blacks Lake Number Two, el.  
	Browns Lake, el.  
	Brushlake Reservoir, el.  
	Carter Lake, el.  
	Davis Lake, el.  
	Days Lake, el.  
	Dears Pond, el.  
	Deihl Lake, el.  
	Gentry Lake, el.  
	Jewell Lake, el.  
	Lake Bennett, el.  
	Lake Carol-Dan, el.  
	Lake Conway, el.  
	Lake Conway Nursery Pond, el.  
	Lawrences Lake, el.  
	Meers Lake, el.  
	Montgomery Lake, el.  
	Murray Lake, el.  
	Nalholz Lake, el.  
	Parks Lake, el.  
	Pool Eight, el.  
	Roberts Pond, el.  
	Robins Lake, el.  
	Stevens Lake, el.  
	Stone Lake, el.  
	Torian Lake, el.  
	Tupelo Bayou Site One Reservoir, el.  
	Tupelo Bayou Site Two Reservoir, el.  
	Watson Lake, el.  
	Williams Lake, el.  
	Wisley Lake, el.

See also

 List of lakes in Arkansas

Notes

Bodies of water of Faulkner County, Arkansas
Faulkner